Mamba Sano (1903 in Kissidougou, Guinea – July 4, 1985) was a Guinean politician who served in the French National Assembly from 1946-1958 .

References 
 1st page on the French National Assembly website  
 2nd page on the French National Assembly website

1903 births
1985 deaths
People from Faranah Region
Guinean politicians
Deputies of the 1st National Assembly of the French Fourth Republic
Deputies of the 2nd National Assembly of the French Fourth Republic